Tbaytel, formerly the Thunder Bay Telephone Company, is a municipally-owned telecommunications company operating in Thunder Bay, Ontario, Canada, and the surrounding area. Tbaytel's services include data, voice, wireless, internet, digital TV and security.

Tbaytel claims to have Northern Ontario's largest 4G Network within a 300,000 km2 area providing coverage along major highway corridors from just west of Sault Ste. Marie to the Manitoba border and north to Red Lake and Geraldton to the US border.  Tbaytel operates HSPA+ and LTE networks.

Presently, Tbaytel is the largest independently owned telecommunications provider in Canada.  Tbaytel is wholly owned by the Corporation of the City of Thunder Bay.  Tbaytel has paid dividends every year since the late 1990s to The City of Thunder Bay, with an annual dividend of approximately $3 million. Today this annual fixed dividend has increased to $17 million.  As of 2017, total dividends paid by Tbaytel to the City of Thunder Bay exceed $200 million.

Services

Residential 

Wireless Service (HSPA+/LTE)
Tbaytel Free Public Wi-Fi is Tbaytel's public Wi-Fi service.  Available at various public locations throughout Thunder Bay, Dryden and Fort Frances for the public to use.
Fixed Wireless Internet (also known as Canopy) to provide broadband internet services to rural addresses which currently are not serviced by wireline connections.
HSPA and LTE wireless networks available throughout Northwestern Ontario.
Tbaytel currently offers limited VOLTE service.  Most voice traffic is routed through HSPA+, while data service can utilize LTE where available.
High Speed Internet is Tbaytel's Internet and Data Services (Internet over VDSL or Optical fibre)
Tbaytel TV (Digital TV)  is Tbaytel's IPTV Services, including High-definition television, Restart TV and Whole Home PVR CraveTV is a subscription on-demand video streaming service available to Tbaytel TV subscribers.
Tbaytel Security is Tbaytel's security monitoring service for home and business.
Tbaytel offers Smart Home monitoring, Home Security and Personal Medical Alarms.
tbaytel.net Email Services
Local Access and Enhanced Services
Long Distance Phone Services (over POTS or Optical fibre)
Voice Mail Services
Telephone and Equipment Rental
Web Hosting and Website Design

Business 

 Communication & Collaboration
 Managed Network Services
 Internet & Networks
 Wireless
 Security

History 
The company was established in 1902, when  Thunder Bay Telephone was formed to connect the then-independent communities of Port Arthur and Fort William.  When Port Arthur and Fort William amalgamated to form The City of Thunder Bay, Thunder Bay Telephone became a city department.  In 2004, Thunder Bay Telephone was renamed to Tbaytel.  Tbaytel also appointed its first Municipal Services Board in 2004, allowing it to be operated independently, but it remained 100% owned and operated by the City of Thunder Bay.

Technological and service advances 

 In 1902, Isaac Lamont Matthews (Mayor of Port Arthur) and Joshua Dyke (Mayor of Fort William) made the first phone call in the area.
 In 1926, the first long-distance call was completed between the mayors of Fort William and Winnipeg
 In 1949, direct dial calling was available.  The first call was made between Hubert Badanai (Mayor of Fort William) and Frederick Oliver Robinson (Mayor of Port Arthur)
 In 1958, mobile radio telephone service was introduced.
 In 1964, direct long-distance dialing came to Thunder Bay
 In 1975, Thunder Bay Telephone installed electronic stored switching equipment
 In 1981, the first digital switching equipment in Northwestern Ontario was installed in Thunder bay
 In 1984, Thunder Bay Telephone installed the first fibre optic cable in Thunder Bay between two exchanges located in Port Arthur and Fort William - spanning over 7 km.
 In 1990, Thunder Bay Telephone launched cellular services
 In 1996, Thunder Bay Telephone offered dial-up internet
 In 1999, Thunder Bay Telephone installed the first digital cellular site in Thunder Bay
 In 2000, Thunder Bay Telephone introduced High-Speed ADSL Internet service in Thunder Bay
 In 2006, Thunder Bay Telephone acquired Superior Wireless to improve cellular service throughout Northwestern Ontario
 In 2007, Tbaytel acquired Apex Security and began offering home security monitoring
 In 2010, Tbaytel announced a partnership with Rogers Wireless and launched a 3G HSPA network serving Northwestern Ontario 
 On November 23, 2010, Tbaytel launched their Digital TV Service.  At launch, the service provided HDTV, whole-home PVR and web-based scheduling of recordings using Motorola VIP2262 set-top boxes.  This made Tbaytel the first telecommunications provider in the region to offer a five-product bundle
 In 2011, Tbaytel upgraded and rebranded its mobility network to a 4G HSPA+ Network
 In November 2012, Tbaytel purchased Dryden Municipal Telephone Service's (DMTS) wireless subscriber base. The DMTS wireless network was shut down in December 2012
 In December 2012, Tbaytel signed a roaming agreement with KNet (Keewaytinook Okimakanak) to allow wireless customers to freely roam between communities north of Tbaytel's serving area and Tbaytel's existing infrastructure
 In 2013, Tbaytel began implementing Fibre to the home
 In 2013, Tbaytel launched Free Public WiFi hotspots throughout Thunder Bay
 On October 1, 2014, Tbaytel decommissioned its legacy CDMA network
 On March 23, 2015, Tbaytel launched a 4G LTE network in Thunder Bay utilizing the AWS spectrum
 In 2017, Tbaytel launched a second LTE carrier utilizing the 700 MHz frequency, which expands coverage and reliability of its LTE network
 On November 6, 2017, Tbaytel expanded its Fibre offerings to the town of Fort Frances, making it Tbaytel's first regional wireline expansion
 On March 22, 2018, Tbaytel announced plans to deliver Tbaytel Fibre to residents and businesses in the City of Dryden, with an anticipated launch date in 2019
On January 24, 2019, Tbaytel officially launched Fibre service in the city of Dryden.

References

External links

Companies based in Thunder Bay
Companies owned by municipalities of Canada
Mobile phone companies of Canada
1902 establishments in Ontario
IPTV companies of Canada
Internet service providers of Canada
Municipal government of Thunder Bay